Euphaedra mayumbensis is a butterfly in the family Nymphalidae. It is found in the Democratic Republic of the Congo (Mayumbe) and the western part of the Central African Republic.

References

Butterflies described in 1981
mayumbensis